Robert Jenkins (July 10, 1769April 18, 1848) was a member of the United States House of Representatives from Pennsylvania.

Biography

Early life
Robert Jenkins was born at Windsor Forge Mansion in Caernarvon Township in the Province of Pennsylvania. He attended the common schools and the select school of Dr. Robert Smith of Pequea.  He was an ironmaster in Caernarvon Township, and a member of the Pennsylvania House of Representatives in 1804 and 1805.

Career
He was elected as a Federalist to the Tenth and Eleventh Congresses. He was a member of a Group of Horse, and took an active part in suppressing the Whisky Insurrection in Pennsylvania.

Personal life
He married Catherine Carmichael (1775–1853). They had two sons and six daughters: David Jenkins (1800–1850) and John Carmichael Jenkins (1809–1855), Elizabeth Jenkins (1803–1870), Mary Jenkins (1805–1859), Martha Jenkins (1805–1890), Phoebe Ann Jenkins (1807–1872), Catharine Jenkins (1812–1886), and Sarah Jenkins (1817-unknown).

Death
He died at Windsor Forge in 1848. He was buried in the Caernarvon Presbyterian Churchyard in Churchtown, Pennsylvania.

Legacy
He was a grandfather of noted American sculptor and poet Blanche Nevin (1841–1925).

Sources

1769 births
1848 deaths
People from Lancaster County, Pennsylvania
Federalist Party members of the United States House of Representatives from Pennsylvania
Members of the Pennsylvania House of Representatives
American ironmasters